NAOC may refer to:

 National Astronomical Observatories, Chinese Academy of Sciences (中国科学院国家天文台)
Nagano Olympic Organizing Committee of the 1998 Winter Olympic Games
 National Airborne Operations Center, the Boeing E-4B aircraft
 The New Adventures of Old Christine, an American comedy series starring Julia Louis-Dreyfus
 New American Opportunity Campaign, a campaign of the Coalition for Comprehensive Immigration Reform
 Netherlands Antilles Olympic Committee, the National Olympic Committee of Curaçao, Sint Maarten, Bonaire, Sint Eustatius and Saba
 Nigerian Agip Oil Company, a subsidiary of Italian company Agip
 North Absheron Operating Company, oil consortium established in Azerbaijan for development of Dan Ulduzu and Ashrafi oil and gas fields
 North American Orienteering Championships